Artiguelouve is a commune in the Pyrénées-Atlantiques department in the Nouvelle-Aquitaine region of south-western France.

The inhabitants of the commune are known as Artiguelouviens or Artiguelouviennes.

Geography

Artiguelouve is located in the urban area of Pau some 8 km north-west of Pau and 3 km south-west of Lescar. Access to the commune is by road D2 from Laroin in the south-east passing through the north-east of the commune and continuing north-west to Pardies. The D509 connects the D2 to the D817 across the river. The D804 branches off the D2 in the commune and goes west along the northern fringe of the town and continues to Arbus. Access to the centre of the town is by the D146 which branches off the D804 and goes south through the town and continues to Aubertin. The residential area of the town occupies about 10% of the commune with the rest mixed forest and farmland.

Bus Route 802 from Artix to Pau of the Interurban network of Pyrénées-Atlantiques has a stop in the commune.

The Gave de Pau runs along the north-eastern border of the commune and passes through the north of the commune flowing north-west. The Juscle river flows from the south of the commune to near the town then flows north-west parallel to the Gave de Pau until it eventually joins the Gave de Pau near Tarsacq.

Places and Hamlets

 Baïlot
 Barat
 Barrailh
 Les Barthes
 Bénou
 Biroulet
 Bordenave
 Brouquisse
 Castagnous
 Castéra
 Cinquau
 Coudelounguet
 Duran
 Le Gras
 Grassa
 Guillou
 Haget
 Lacoste
 Lacoude
 Lacoustète
 Lansolles
 Larréheuga
 Lassauque
 Loumède
 Loustau
 Milhé
 Cité des Mimosas
 Mirande
 Mondet
 Ogeu (fountain)
 Paille
 Pélou
 Peyreblanque
 Piqueur
 Pucheu
 Puyade
 Les Sagettes
 Salaberthe
 Serra
 Tuquet
 Turon
 Le Vert Galant

Neighbouring communes and villages

Toponymy

Artiguelouve (meaning "clearing of wolves" in the béarnaise definition), comes from artiga which means "clearing" or "fallow land" and the oronym lob ("height").

The following table details the origins of the commune name and other names in the commune.

Sources:
Raymond: Topographic Dictionary of the Department of Basses-Pyrenees, 1863, on the page numbers indicated in the table. 
Grosclaude: Toponymic Dictionary of communes, Béarn, 2006 
Marca: Pierre de Marca, History of Béarn.
Cassini: Cassini Map from 1750

Origins:
Marca: Pierre de Marca, History of Béarn.
Order of Malta: Titles of the Order of Malta
Census: Census of Béarn
Lescar: Cartulary of Lescar
Cour Major: Regulations of the Cour Major
Reformation: Reformation of Béarn

History
Paul Raymond noted on page 14 of his 1863 dictionary that, in 1385, Artiguelouve had 28 fires and depended on the bailiwick of Pau. The commune was a dependency of the Marquisate of Gassion and, with Poey, formed the jurisdiction of a notary.

Heraldry

Administration

List of Successive Mayors

Inter-communality

The commune is part of seven inter-communal structures:
 the Communauté d'agglomération Pau Béarn Pyrénées;
 the SIVU for nursing home care for senior citizens in the Canton of Lescar;
 the AEP association of Gave and Baise;
 the association for the management of the drainage basin of the Juscle and its tributaries;
 the Sanitation association for the communes of the valleys of the Juscle and the Baise;
 the Energy association of Pyrénées-Atlantiques;
 the inter-communal association for defence against flooding of the Gave de Pau;

Demography
In 2017 the commune had 1,621 inhabitants.

Economy

The commune is part of the Appellation d'origine contrôlée (AOC) zones of Jurançon AOC, Béarn AOC, and Ossau-iraty.

Culture and heritage

Religious heritage

The Church of Saint-Michel (15th century) is registered as a historical monument.

Facilities

Education

The commune has a school grouping consisting of two kindergarten classes and five primary school class (Marc Dugène School Group) as well as a library / media centre.

Sports and Sports facilities
The Artiguelouve Golf Course and also that of Billère are the two golf courses in the Pau area.
La Maison des sports was opened on 29 May 2010.

Le FC3A'' is a football club and school for players from Artiguelouve, Arbus, and Aubertin.

Notable people linked to the communePaul Ducournau''', born at Orthez in 1910 and died at Artiguelouve in 1985, was a general in the French Army.

See also
Communes of the Pyrénées-Atlantiques department

References

External links
Artiguelouve official website 
Artigalouve on the 1750 Cassini Map

Communes of Pyrénées-Atlantiques